Dwight Joseph Bialowas (born September 8, 1952) is a Canadian former professional ice hockey defenceman. He was drafted in the second round, 18th overall, by the Atlanta Flames in the 1972 NHL Amateur Draft. He played 164 games in the National Hockey League between 1973 and 1977: 48 with the Flames and 116 with the Minnesota North Stars.

Regular season and playoffs

External links
 

1952 births
Living people
Atlanta Flames draft picks
Atlanta Flames players
Canadian expatriate ice hockey players in the United States
Canadian ice hockey defencemen
Fort Worth Texans players
Ice hockey people from Saskatchewan
Minnesota North Stars players
New Haven Nighthawks players
Nova Scotia Voyageurs players
Omaha Knights (CHL) players
Regina Pats players
Sportspeople from Regina, Saskatchewan